Angamaly Orthodox Diocese may refer to:
 Angamaly Malankara Orthodox Diocese, Kerala, India
 Angamaly Jacobite Orthodox Diocese, Kerala, India